Deanna Yusoff (born 3 January 1967) is a Malaysian actress, best known for her roles in the television series  and  and the films , , , Anna and the King, Chermin, 1965 and Aku Haus Darahmu.

Early life
Yusoff was born on 3 January 1967 in London.

Career
Her breakthrough role was in the 1992 film , which she starred in. She starred in the television series , which aired from 1998 to 2001. She also starred in seasons 3 to 7 of the television series .

She appeared in the 1996 Singaporean film Army Daze and the 1999 American film Anna and the King. She starred in the 2007 horror film Chermin.

She starred in the 2014 film  and in the 2015 Singaporean historical thriller film 1965. In 2017, she starred in the horror film Aku Haus Darahmu.

Filmography

Film
 (1992)
 (1993)
 (1995)
Army Daze (1996)
Return To Paradise (1998)
Anna and the King (1999)
Chermin (2007)
Bola Kampung: The Movie (2013)
 (2014)
1965 (2015)
Aku Haus Darahmu (2017)

Television
Arshad Hussein & Co (1994)
Dunia Rees dan Ina (1995)
 (1998 - 2001)
 (1999)
Cemas (2000)
 (2000)
 (2002 - 2005)
Stories of Love: The Anthology Series (2006)
Random Acts (2007)
Legend (2017)

References

Living people
1967 births
People from London
Malaysian Muslims
Malaysian people of Malay descent
Malaysian people of British descent
Malaysian actresses
Malaysian film actresses
Malaysian television actresses